The Indio River is a river of Vega Baja and Morovis in Puerto Rico. Indio River has mogotes on either side.  Indio River meets Cibuco River. The river is quick to rise and causes flooding when there is heavy rain.

Paso del Indio
Discovered when a highway was being built, it contained artifacts and bones carbon dated to 2580 b.c.

Gallery

See also
 Paso del Indio Site: archeological site along the river
 List of rivers of Puerto Rico

References

External links
 USGS Hydrologic Unit Map – Caribbean Region (1974)
 Ríos de Puerto Rico 

Rivers of Puerto Rico
Vega Baja, Puerto Rico
Morovis, Puerto Rico